Happy Man may refer to:

 A Happy Man (1932 film) (Un homme heureux), a French film by Antonin Bideau
 A Happy Man (2009 film) (Le Bonheur de Pierre), a Canadian film by Robert Ménard
 "Happy Man" (Cathal Dunne song), 1979
 "Happy Man" (Sunnyboys song), 1981
 "Happy Man", a song by Chic from C'est Chic, 1978
 "Happy Man", a song by Jungle from For Ever, 2018

See also
 Happy Human, an icon adopted as a symbol of secular humanism